On April 27, 2021, sisters Anna and Olivia Zimmermann, aged one and six years old respectively, were kidnapped by their father, Tomás Antonio Gimeno Casañas, on the island of Tenerife, Spain. The case had a large impact on Spanish society and media. Anna and Gimeno have never been found, but are presumed dead.

Murders
The girls, born as Anna and Olivia Gimeno Zimmermann, were two sisters aged one and six respectively and daughters of Tomás Antonio Gimeno Casañas and Beatriz Zimmermann de Zárate who were kidnapped by their father on the night of April 27, 2021, when he was supposed to have delivered them to the mother. Tomás Gimeno initially took the two girls to the house of their paternal grandparents in Santa Cruz de Tenerife.

Gimeno told Zimmerman that he was going out with the girls to dinner, which was false and only used it as an excuse to get more time to carry out the crime. Anna and Olivia were allegedly murdered minutes after this call at Gimeno's house in the town of Igueste de Candelaria. He took the corpses of his daughters in his car and stopped at his parents' house without their noticing. That night, Tomás went to the Puerto Marina de Tenerife, where around 9:30 p.m. he unloaded several sports bags on his boat. He left the port around 12:30 a.m. Earlier, he had called the girls' mother Beatriz, threatening that she would never see the girls or him again.

Search
Tomás Gimeno's boat appeared the next morning, April 28, floating and without anchor, near Puertito de Güímar. Later, on April 29, a child restraint seat for vehicles belonging to one of the girls was found floating, and it was reported that bloody remains were found in Gimeno's boat the day before. An investigation was opened, considered one of the most complex that the Central Operational Unit (UCO) of the Civil Guard has had to face, which also intervened in the resolution of the cases of Diana Quer, Asunta Basterra, or Gabriel Cruz. Tomás Gimeno's house in the town of Igueste de Candelaria was searched on April 30, a search that continued in subsequent days.

The ship Ángeles Alvariño, from the Spanish Institute of Oceanography, joined the search on May 29. The ship found an oxygen tank and a duvet cover owned by the girls' father underwater on June 8, this finding ultimately expanding her presence in Canary waters at least until June 15.

Finally, at the end of June, it was reported that the oceanographic vessel Ángeles Alvariño had ended the search for the bodies of Anna and her father after a month of searching. The technical report of the Civil Guard concluded that the large number of gullies and underwater crevices made exploration difficult.

Olivia's body found
The body of the missing girl was found off the coast of the island's capital, Santa Cruz de Tenerife, near the Auditorio de Tenerife.

After the discovery, the body was transferred to the Forensic Anatomical Institute of Tenerife for an autopsy. The following day, it was revealed that fingerprint tests confirmed that it was Olivia's body.

Upon the discovery of Olivia's body, Beatriz Zimmermann expressed her desire to remove the paternal surname from her daughters' names, thus erasing any link that may refer to it, leaving names such as Olivia and Anna Zimmermann de Zárate. On June 13, Beatriz published a letter of thanks for the support received.

Reactions

The case was the subject of great media coverage that transcended the borders of Spain. Newscasts and newspapers from various countries in Latin America, the United Kingdom, Italy, Portugal, Germany, and Australia echoed the case.

Politics
Several politicians and ministers expressed their condolences to the girls' mother, including: the Prime Minister of Spain, Pedro Sánchez; the Minister of Equality, Irene Montero; the president of the People's Party, Pablo Casado; the President of the Canary Islands, Ángel Víctor Torres; and the president of Citizens, Inés Arrimadas, among others. 

Queen Letizia of Spain expressed her condemnation the day after the discovery of Olivia's body, during the closing of the Santander Womennow 2021 forum.

Culture, music, and sport
Through social media, various personalities from the world of culture, music and sports expressed their condemnation of the event, such as Paz Vega, Alejandro Sanz, Pastora Soler, Rudy Fernández, María Castro, Santiago Segura, Antonio Banderas, Marta Sánchez, Blas Cantó, Carlos Baute, Edurne, Malú, Rozalén, Álex García, Sergio Rodríguez, Raquel del Rosario, and Paula Echevarría, among others.

Public opinion
As a result of the discovery of Olivia's body, demonstrations, rallies, a minute of silence, and public acts condemning the act were called in most Spanish municipalities, standing out in large cities and provincial capitals, such as Madrid, Barcelona, Valencia, Granada, Toledo, Murcia, Cartagena, Lorca, Palma de Mallorca, Seville, Málaga, San Sebastián, Valladolid, Santiago de Compostela, Bilbao, Salamanca, and Santa Cruz de Tenerife itself, on whose coasts appeared the corpse of the oldest of the sisters, among other cities.

Tribute
On October 18, 2022, a bronze statue was inaugurated in homage to Anna and Olivia, located in the La Gesta of July 25 children's park, next to the Plaza de España in the city of Santa Cruz de Tenerife. The work of the Basque-born sculptor based in Tenerife, Julio Nieto, the work, in the words of the author: ―«is a soft design that reminds us of Anna and Olivia, their happy life, that tender look between them, of complicity and trust»―. The sculpture was donated by the Fundación Diario de Avisos. During the inauguration, the mother of the girls Beatriz Zimmermann and different political authorities were present.

See also
José Bretón case
List of kidnappings
List of solved missing person cases

References

2020s missing person cases
2021 in Spain
Child abuse resulting in death
Domestic violence
Filicides
Formerly missing people
Gender-related violence
History of the Canary Islands
Infanticide
Kidnapped children
Missing person cases in Spain
People murdered in Spain
Sisters
Violence against women in Spain